Peter Hewitt Hare (March 12, 1935 — January 3, 2008) was an American philosopher and Distinguished Service Professor Emeritus at the University at Buffalo.

Hare is known for his works addressing the problem of evil. Hare and Edward H. Madden's book Evil and the Concept of God (1968) is regarded as highly influential in the literature of problem of evil and has been cited by both critics and supporters.

Selected publications

Hare, Peter H; Madden, Edward H (1966). Evil and Unlimited Power. The Review of Metaphysics 20 (2): 278–289.
Hare, Peter H; Madden, Edward H (1968). Evil and the Concept of God. Charles C. Thomas.
Hare, Peter H; Madden, Edward H (1972). Evil and Inconclusiveness Sophia 11 (1): 8–12. 
Hare, Peter H; Madden, Edward H (1972). Evil and Persuasive Power.  Process Studies 2 (1): 44–48.

References

1935 births
2008 deaths
20th-century American essayists
20th-century American male writers
20th-century American philosophers
21st-century American essayists
21st-century American male writers
21st-century American philosophers
American ethicists
American male essayists
American male non-fiction writers
American philosophy academics
Analytic philosophers
Epistemologists
Metaphysicians
Metaphysics writers
Ontologists
Philosophers of religion
Philosophers of social science
Social philosophers
Theorists on Western civilization
University at Buffalo faculty
Writers about religion and science